Perry Mason is a fictional criminal defense attorney.

Perry Mason may also refer to:

Adaptations 
 Perry Mason (theatrical film series), a series of six American films released in the 1930s
 Perry Mason (radio series), broadcast on CBS Radio from 1943–55
 Perry Mason (1957 TV series), a 1957–1966 American legal drama television series broadcast on CBS Television
 The New Perry Mason, a 1973 TV series broadcast on CBS
 Perry Mason (TV film series), a series of 30 television film sequels to the CBS-TV series broadcast on NBC (1985–1995)
 Perry Mason (2020 TV series), a 2020 television series broadcast on HBO.

Other 
 "Perry Mason", an Ozzy Osbourne song on the album Ozzmosis
 Jah Mason (born 1970), reggae artist formerly known as Perry Mason

See also 
 Perry Mason bibliography, novels and short stories written by Erle Stanley Gardner

Perry Mason